Guatemalan Passports are issued to Guatemalan citizens to travel outside Guatemala. As of 1 January 2017, Guatemalan citizens had visa-free or visa on arrival access to 133 countries and territories, ranking the Guatemalan passport 40th in terms of travel freedom (tied with Dominica passport) according to the Henley visa restrictions index.

Appearance

Like all Central American passports the cover is navy with gold fonts stating the official name of the country in Spanish and in English, the Emblem of Guatemala in the middle and the words Pasaporte and Passport at the bottom. There is now a newer version of the cover, which has kept many of the old features. The main difference is that now at the top it has the words Centro America and in the middle, instead of the coat of arms, a map of Central America is displayed with the Guatemalan territory shaded. At the bottom the wording changed to depict the type of passport.

Passports have a validity of five years and the languages used are Spanish and English.

Security features

The Guatemalan passport contains many security features in it like colored fibers embedded in the pages, a watermark on all pages, and others. Like in the quetzal bills, the passport has an outline of an image on one side and on the other side the image is colored; and when a page is held up against light, the observer is able to see the color on the white outline.

Guatemalan passports are machine readable and contain a PDF417 2D barcode with the holder's biometric information. Because of this detail, no attempts have been made to also include the RFID chip yet.

The passport issuing authority is the Dirección General de Migración (General Immigration Directorship), a dependency of the Ministerio de Gobernación (Ministry of the Interior).

Types of Passports
Ordinarios (Personal) - Issued to Guatemalan citizens for general travel and are requested through the General Immigration Directorship.
Oficiales (Official) - Issued to Guatemalan employed officials who are holding an office in the government and represent the country. These passports are requested through the General Immigration Directorship.
Diplomaticos (Diplomatic) - Issued to Guatemalan high-ranking officials that are employed by the government. These passports need to be requested through the Ministerio de Relaciones Exteriores (Ministry of Foreign Affairs)
Temporales (Temporal) - Issued only to government officials or diplomats who represent the country for a specified period of time.

See also
 Central America-4 passport
 Visa requirements for Guatemalan citizens

References

Visa requirements by country from the Guatemalan MOFA
 Council regulation 539/2001 
 Council regulation 1932/2006 
 Council regulation 539/2001 consolidated version, 19.1.2007  
 List of nationals who do need a visa to visit the UK .
 List of countries whose passport holders do not require visas to enter Ireland .

External links
 Dirección General de Migración 
 Ministerio de Relaciones Exteriores

Government of Guatemala
Passports by country